Ellen is the surname of:

 Cliff Ellen (born 1930), Australian actor, nephew of Joff Ellen
 Joff Ellen (1915–1999), Australian actor and comedian born Raymond Charles Ellen
 Mark Ellen (born 1953), English magazine editor, journalist and broadcaster
 Mary Ann Ellen (1897–1949), New Zealand rural women's advocate, community leader and hairdresser
 Roy Ellen (born 1947), British professor of anthropology and human ecology
 Shane Ellen (born 1973), former Australian rules footballer

See also
 J. Harold Ellens (1932–2018), psychologist and theologian